NGC 4179 is a lenticular galaxy located in the constellation Virgo. It was discovered by William Herschel on January 14, 1784. It is a member of the NGC 4179 Group of galaxies, which is a member of the Virgo II Groups, a series of galaxies and galaxy clusters strung out from the southern edge of the Virgo Supercluster.

References

External links 
 

Virgo (constellation)
4179
Lenticular galaxies
Virgo Cluster
038950